Viliami Vailea (born 17 November 2002) is a Tongan professional rugby league footballer who plays as a  for the New Zealand Warriors in the NRL.

2021 
In round 20 of the 2021 NRL season, Vailea made his debut for the Warriors against the Wests Tigers at Suncorp Stadium in a 18–16 win.

2022 
He made a total of ten appearances for the New Zealand Warriors in the 2022 NRL season as they finished 15th on the table.

References

External links
New Zealand Warriors profile

Tongan rugby league players
Rugby league centres
New Zealand Warriors players
Living people
2002 births